This is an incomplete list of University of Tasmania people, including alumni and staff.

Alumni

Academia
 Ed Byrne, Principal of King's College London
 Peter Conrad, literary academic and author
 Rodney Croome, academic and LGBT rights activist 
 Peter Forrest, philosopher
 Marnie Hughes-Warrington, Deputy Vice-Chancellor of the Australian National University 
 Jeff Malpas, philosopher
 Tim McCormack, academic and specialist in international humanitarian law 
 Michael Tate, Catholic priest, legal scholar and former Labor politician 
 Helen Tiffin, post-colonial theorist

Business
 Andrew MacLeod, businessman, author, former humanitarian lawyer and aid worker
Capt. Mohamed Juma Al Shamisi, CEO of Abu Dhabi Ports
 Saul Eslake, economist

Government

Vice-Regal
 Stanley Burbury, past Governor of Tasmania 
 William Cox, past Governor of Tasmania
 Sir Guy Green, past Governor of Tasmania 
 Peter Underwood, past Governor of Tasmania
 Kate Warner, legal academic and current Governor of Tasmania

Politics

Federal politicians
 Eric Abetz, Liberal politician 
 Neal Blewett , former Labor politician 
 Ross Hart, former Labor politician
 Michael Hodgman , former Liberal politician and barrister
 Justine Keay, former Labor politician 
 Christine Milne , former leader of the Australian Greens
 Ben Small, former Liberal politician

State Premiers
 David Bartlett, former Premier of Tasmania
 Michael Field, former Premier of Tasmania
 Lara Giddings, Labor politician and former Premier of Tasmania 
 Will Hodgman, Liberal politician and former Premier of Tasmania

State and territory politicians
 Guy Barnett, Liberal politician
 Sir Max Bingham, former Deputy Premier and Opposition Leader of Tasmania
 David Bushby, Liberal politician 
 Roy Fagan, former barrister and Deputy Premier of Tasmania 
 Mike Gaffney, Independent MLC 
 Adrian Gibson, former Liberal politician and barrister 
 Sue Napier, former Liberal politician 
 Michelle O'Byrne, Labor politician
 Ros Spence, Labor politician

Other politicians
 Sue Hickey, Lord Mayor of Hobart 
 Albert Van Zetten, Mayor of Launceston 
 Hannah Yeoh, member of the Selangor State Legislative Assembly
Halimah Ali ,Malaysian politician, MP for Kapar

Public servants
 Ashton Calvert, former Secretary of the Department of Foreign Affairs and Trade; Rhodes Scholar 
 Stephen Gumley, CEO of the Australian Defence Materiel Organisation 
 Philip Haddon-Cave, former Financial Secretary of Hong Kong 
 Fathimath Dhiyana Saeed, SAARC Secretary-General

Humanities

Arts
 Anthony Ackroyd, comedian, speaker and writer
 Courtney Barnett, musician 
 Rianti Cartwright, actress, model and presenter of MTV Indonesia 
 John Clark, former director of NIDA
 Ian Cresswell, composer 
 Essie Davis, film actress
 Matthew Dewey, composer 
 Hannah Gadsby, comedian
 Roger Hodgman, director
 Constantine Koukias, composer 
 Michael Lampard, opera singer, conductor and composer 
 Geoffrey Lancaster, classical pianist  
 Andrew Legg, ARIA-award nominated musician 
 Raffaele Marcellino, composer 
 Luke McGregor, comedian and actor
 Graeme Murphy, ballet dancer and choreographer 
 Robyn Nevin, actress, director and former head of the Sydney Theatre Company 
 Tom Samek, painter, stage designer and printmaker 
 Prithviraj Sukumaran, South Indian actor
 Megan Walch, artist 
 David Walsh, founder of the Museum of Old and New Art
 Shaun Wilson, artist and film director

History
 Marilyn Lake, historian 
 Henry Reynolds, historian

Journalism and media
 John J. Smithies, founding director of the Australian Centre for the Moving Image
 Charles Wooley, television journalist

Literature, writing and poetry
 Ivy Alvarez, author and poet 
 Tim Bowden, author and journalist 
 Helene Chung Martin, author and journalist 
 Stephen Edgar, poet
 Richard Flanagan, author and film director; Rhodes Scholar 
 Christopher Koch, author of The Year of Living Dangerously
 Amanda Lohrey, author and academic 
 Christobel Mattingley, author
 Margaret Scott, author and poet 
 Aaron Smith, author and journalist 
 Vivian Smith, poet
 Danielle Wood, author

Law
 Damian Bugg, former Commonwealth and Tasmanian Director of Public Prosecutions
 Enid Campbell, legal scholar, first Australian female professor and law school dean
 Chief Justice Ewan Crawford, Former Chief Justice and Lieutenant-Governor of Tasmania 
 Stephen Estcourt, Tasmanian Supreme Court judge
 Philip Lewis Griffiths, Acting Chief Judge of the Mandated Territory of New Guinea 
 Hon Justice Peter Heerey, Federal Court Judge 
 Andrew Inglis Clark, principal author of the Australian Constitution, barrister, politician and judge
 Duncan Kerr, Judge of the Federal Court of Australia, President of the Administrative Appeals Tribunal and former Attorney-General of Australia
 Michael Mansell, Aboriginal rights activist and criminal lawyer 
 Davendra Pathik, former Judge of the Supreme Court of Fiji
 David Mitchell, former Solicitor-general of Lesotho, Tasmanian representative at the Australian Constitutional Convention 1998 and procurator of the Presbyterian Church of Australia

Sciences

 Noel Benson, geologist
 Geoffrey Charles Bratt, chemist and lichenologist
 Edward Byrne, neuroscientist, Principal of King's College, London; former Vice-Chancellor of Monash University
 John Donaldson, applied mathematics academic; father of Mary, Crown Princess of Denmark
 Richard Dowden (scientist) - noted geo- and astrophysicist
 Theodore Thomson Flynn, biologist and professor of biology; father of Errol Flynn
 Sir Leonard Huxley, physicist 
 Catherine King, ecotoxicologist, Antarctic researcher 
 Kenneth G. McCracken, physicist and winner of the Pawsey Medal
 Jessica Melbourne-Thomas, marine ecologist and ecosystem modeller with the Australian Antarctic Division
 Beryl Nashar, geologist and first female PhD in geology, first female Dean of a School in Australia
 David Paver Mellor, inorganic chemist

Sports
 George Bailey, Australian cricketer
 Brendon Bolton, senior coach of the Carlton Football Club
 Scott Brennan, gold medalist at the 2008 Beijing Summer Olympics for rowing 
 Peter Daniel, former Essendon footballer 
 Simon Hollingsworth, former athlete and CEO of the Australian Sports Commission; Rhodes Scholar
 Kerry Hore, Olympic rower
 Hamish Peacock, Olympic javelin thrower
 Meaghan Volker, Olympic rower
 Denis Scanlon, former Essendon footballer

Other
 Phillip Aspinall, Primate of the Anglican Church of Australia
 Simon Longstaff, Executive Director of the St James Ethics Centre
 Michael Lynch, evangelist and Christian blogger
 Bill Mollison, "father of permaculture" 
 Brodie Neill, industrial designer
 Helen Szoke, Chief Executive of Oxfam Australia, former Australian Race Discrimination Commissioner and former Victorian Equal Opportunity and Human Rights Commissioner

Administration

Chancellors

Vice-Chancellors

Faculty

 Thomas Bavin, law academic and past Premier of New South Wales 
 David Bollard, classical pianist 
 Angela Christine Bridgland (former lecturer at TCAE), library educator
 Barry Brook, environmental sustainability academic 
 Hans Adolph Buchdahl, physicist 
 Douglas Copland, economist 
 Rodney Croome, LGBT advocate and academic 
 Winifred Curtis, botanist, author and plant science academic 
 Robert Delbourgo, physicist 
 John Dalgleish Donaldson, mathematics academic 
 Roy Fagan, law academic and past Deputy Premier of Tasmania 
 John Field, senior army officer and engineering academic 
 Theodore Thomson Flynn, biologist
 Adrian Franklin, sociologist and television personality 
 Barbara R. Holland, mathematics academic 
 Peter D. Jarvis, physicist 
 Michael Kirby, former Justice of the High Court of Australia
 Gareth Koch, classical guitarist 
 E. E. Kurth, chemistry academic 
 Delphine Lannuzel, sea ice biogeochemist and Antarctic researcher
 Frank Madill, former Liberal politician, medical doctor and author 
 John Martinkus, journalist 
 James McAuley, poet
 Tim McCormack, international humanitarian law academic 
 Lindsay Simpson, journalist, academic and crime writer 
 Sydney Sparkes Orr, philosopher 
 Garth Paltridge, atmospheric physicist 
 Doug Parkinson, law academic and politician 
 Anya Reading, geophysicist 
 Grote Reber, radio astronomer 
 Henry Reynolds, historian
 Steven M. Smith, plant genetics and biochemistry academic
 Muthucumaraswamy Sornarajah, law academic 
 Michael Tate, Catholic priest, legal scholar and former Labor politician
 Helen Tiffin, post-colonial theorist
 Ernest Ewart Unwin, education academic 
 Edward Ronald Walker, diplomat and economist 
 Kate Warner, legal academic and current Governor of Tasmania
 Peter Whish-Wilson, politician and economist

References

people
Tasmania